Dame Flora McKenzie Robson  (28 March 19027 July 1984) was an English actress and star of the theatrical stage and cinema, particularly renowned for her performances in plays demanding dramatic and emotional intensity. Her range extended from queens to murderesses.

Early life
Flora McKenzie Robson was born on 28 March 1902 in South Shields, County Durham, of Scottish descent to a family of six siblings. Many of her forebears were engineers, mostly in shipping. Her father was a ship's engineer who moved from Wallsend near Newcastle to Palmers Green in 1907 and Southgate in 1910, both in north London, and later to Welwyn Garden City.

She was educated at the Palmers Green High School and the Royal Academy of Dramatic Art, where she won a bronze medal in 1921.

Career
Her father discovered that Flora had a talent for recitation and, from the age of 5, she was taken around by horse and carriage to recite, and to compete in recitations. This established a pattern that remained with her.

Robson made her stage debut in 1921. By the 1930s she was appearing in several prominent films both in the UK and in Hollywood, alongside such stars as Laurence Olivier, Paul Muni and George Raft. Her most notable role was that of Queen Elizabeth I in both Fire Over England (1937) and The Sea Hawk (1940). In 1934, Robson played the Empress Elizabeth in Alexander Korda's The Rise of Catherine the Great (1934). She was nominated for the Academy Award for Best Supporting Actress for her role as Angelique Buiton, a servant, in Saratoga Trunk (1945). The same year, audiences in the U.K. and the U.S. watched her hypnotic performance as Ftatateeta, the nursemaid and royal confidante and murderess-upon-command to Vivien Leigh's Queen Cleopatra in the screen adaptation of George Bernard Shaw's Caesar and Cleopatra (1945).

After the Second World War, demonstrating her range, she appeared in Holiday Camp (1947), the first of a series of films which featured the very ordinary Huggett family; as Sister Philippa in Black Narcissus (1947); as a magistrate in Good-Time Girl (1948); as a prospective Labour MP in Frieda (1947); and in the costume melodrama Saraband for Dead Lovers (1948). Her other film roles included the Empress Dowager Cixi in 55 Days at Peking (1963), Miss Milchrest in Murder at the Gallop (1963), the Queen of Hearts in Alice's Adventures in Wonderland (1972), and Livia in the aborted I, Claudius in 1937.

She struggled to find a footing in the theatre after she graduated from RADA with a bronze medal since she lacked the conventional good looks which were then an absolute requisite for actresses in dramatic roles. After touring in minor parts with Ben Greet's Shakespeare company she may have played small parts for two seasons in the new repertory company at Oxford, but her contract was not renewed. She was told that they required a prettier actress. Unable to secure any acting engagements, she gave up the stage at the age of 23, and she took up work as a welfare officer in the Shredded Wheat factory in Welwyn Garden City.  Tyrone Guthrie, due to direct a season at the new Festival Theatre, Cambridge, asked her to join his company. Her performance as the stepdaughter in Pirandello's Six Characters in Search of an Author made her the theatrical talk of Cambridge. She followed  with Isabella in Measure for Measure with Robert Donat, Pirandello's Naked, the title role in Iphigenia in Tauris, Varya in The Cherry Orchard, and Rebecca West in Henrik Ibsen's Rosmersholm.

In 1931, she was cast as the adulterous Abbie in Eugene O'Neill's Desire Under the Elms. Her brief, shocking appearance as the doomed prostitute in James Bridie's play The Anatomist put her firmly on the road to success. "If you are not moved by this girl's performance, then you are immovable" the Observer critic wrote. This success would lead to her famous 1933 season as leading lady at the Old Vic.

She continued her acting career late into life, though not on the West End stage, from which she retired at the age of 67, often for American television films, including a lavish production of A Tale of Two Cities (in which she played Miss Pross). She also performed for British television, including The Shrimp and the Anemone. In the 1960s, she continued to act in the West End, in Ring Round the Moon, The Importance of Being Earnest and Three Sisters, among others.

She continued to act on film and television. She was last briefly seen as a Stygian Witch in the fantasy adventure Clash of the Titans in 1981. Both the BBC and ITV made special programs to celebrate her 80th birthday in 1982, and the BBC ran a short season of her best films.

Awards and honours
She was nominated for an Academy Award for Best Supporting Actress as Angelique Buiton, a Haitian maid, in Saratoga Trunk (1945).

She was created a Commander of the Order of the British Empire (CBE) in the 1952 New Year Honours, and raised to Dame Commander (DBE) in the 1960 Birthday Honours. She was also the first famous name to become president of the Brighton Little Theatre.

On 4 July 1958, she received an honorary DLitt from Durham University at a congregation in Durham Castle.

She was the subject of This Is Your Life in February 1961 when she was surprised by Eamonn Andrews in central London.

Personal life and death

Her private life was largely focused on her large family of sisters, nephews and nieces, who used the home in Wykeham Terrace, Brighton, which she shared with sisters, Margaret and Shela.

She died in Brighton, aged 82, in her sleep, of cancer. She was never married and had no children. The two sisters, with whom she shared her life and home, died around the same time: Shela shortly before Flora, in 1984, and Margaret on 1 February 1985.

Legacies

Dame Flora Robson Avenue, built in 1962, in Simonside, South Shields, is named after her.
There is a plaque on the house in Wykeham Terrace, Dyke Road, Brighton, and also one in the doorway of St. Nicholas's Church, of which Flora Robson was a great supporter.

There is also a plaque to commemorate the opening of the Prince Charles Theatre (Leicester Square, London) by Flora Robson.

In 1996, the British Film Institute erected a plaque at number 14 Marine Gardens, location of Flora's other home in Brighton, where she lived from 1961 to 1976.

A plaque at 40 Handside Lane in Welwyn Garden City records Flora Robson living there from 1923 to 1925.

A blue plaque sponsored by Southgate District Civic Trust and Robson's former school Palmers Green High School was unveiled at her family home from 1910 to 1921, The Lawe, 65, The Mall, Southgate, on 25 April 2010.

Robson attended the opening of the Flora Robson Playhouse in Jesmond, Newcastle upon Tyne, in 1962, which was named in her honour. The building was demolished in 1971 and the theatre company it housed relocated to the new University Theatre.

Filmography

Partial television credits

Theatre performances
 Queen Margaret in Will Shakespeare at the Shaftesbury Theatre, London, 1921
 Shakespearean repertory with Ben Greet's company, 1922
 JB Fagan's company at the Oxford Playhouse, 1923
 Two seasons at the Festival Theatre, Cambridge, 1929–30
 Abbey Putnam in Desire Under the Elms at the Gate Theatre, London, 1931
 Herodias in Salome at the Gate Theatre, London, 1931
 Mary Paterson in The Anatomist at the Westminster Theatre, London, 1931
 Stepdaughter in Six Characters in Search of an Author at the Westminster Theatre, London, 1932
 Bianca in Othello at the St. James' Theatre, London, 1932
 Olwen Peel in Dangerous Corner at the Lyric Theatre, London, 1932
 Eva in For Services Rendered at the Globe Theatre, London, 1932
 Ella Downey in All God's Chillun Got Wings at the Embassy Theatre, Swiss Cottage, 1933
 A season at the Old Vic, London, 1933–34
 Mary Read in Mary Read at His Majesty's Theatre, London 1934
 Lady Catherine Brooke in Autumn at the St. Martin's Theatre, London, 1937
 Ellen Creed in Ladies in Retirement at the Henry Miller's Theatre, New York, 1940
 Sarah, Duchess of Malborough in Anne of England at the St. James Theatre, New York, 1941
 Rhoda Meldrum in The Damask Cheek at the Playhouse Theatre, New York, 1942–43
 Thérèse Raquin in Guilty at the Lyric, Hammersmith, 1944
 Agnes Isit in A Man About the House at the Piccadilly Theatre, 1946
 Lady Macbeth in Macbeth at the National Theatre, New York, 1948
 Lady Cicely Waynflete in Captain Brassbound's Conversion at the Lyric, Hammersmith, 1948
 Christine in Black Chiffon, at the Westminster Theatre, 1949 and the 48th Street Theatre, New York, 1950
 Lady Catherine Brooke in Autumn at the Q Theatre, London, 1951
 Paulina in The Winter's Tale at the Phoenix Theatre, London, 1951
 The Return at the Duchess Theatre, London, 1953–54
 Janet in The House by the Lake at the Duke of York's Theatre, London, 1956
 Mrs Alving in Ghosts at the Old Vic, 1958–59 and the Prince's Theatre, London, 1959
 Miss Tina in The Aspern Papers at the Queen's Theatre, London, 1959 and on tour to South Africa, 1960
 Grace Rovarte in Time and Yellow Roses at the St. Martin's Theatre, London, 1961
 Miss Moffatt in The Corn is Green at the Connaught Theatre, Worthing, the Flora Robson Playhouse, Newcastle upon Tyne and on tour to South Africa, 1962
 Gunhild in John Gabriel Borkman at the Duchess Theatre, London, 1963
 Lady Bracknell in The Importance of Being Earnest at the Flora Robson Playhouse, Newcastle upon Tyne, 1964
 Hecuba in The Trojan Women at the Edinburgh Festival, 1966
 Miss Prism in The Importance of Being Earnest at the Theatre Royal Haymarket, London, 1968
 Mother in Ring Round the Moon at the Theatre Royal Haymarket, London, 1968
 Agatha Payne in The Old Ladies at the Duchess Theatre, London, 1969
 Elizabeth I in Elizabeth Tudor, Queen of England at the Edinburgh Festival, 1970

References

External links

 
 
 Flora Robson performances in the Theatre Archive, University of Bristol

 

1902 births
1984 deaths
English people of Scottish descent
Alumni of RADA
Dames Commander of the Order of the British Empire
Actresses awarded damehoods
English Anglicans
English film actresses
English stage actresses
English radio actresses
English television actresses
People from Brighton
People from South Shields
Actresses from Tyne and Wear
Actors from Sussex
Actors from County Durham
People educated at Palmers Green High School
20th-century English actresses
Deaths from cancer in England